Honest Technology, or Honestech Inc., is a supplier of digital video and audio communication and entertainment solutions. Some of their flagship products include VHS to DVD, Audio Recorder, FOTOBOX Plus, MY-IPTV, and Claymation Studio. The company develops products based on real-time MPEG encoding/decoding software technologies.

Products
 VHStoDVD Deluxe 
 Audio Recorder 2.0 Deluxe
 Claymation Studio 2.0
 Video Editor 8.0
 nScreen Deluxe
 nScreen Office
 nScreen Stick
 Home Monitor Wireless
 FOTOBOX Plus

Awards
Honestech Inc. won the 2009 CES "Design and Engineering" award.

References

External links
 https://www.honestech.com/
 https://vidbox.company/

Note: Honestech Inc. has been replaced by VIDBOX Inc.

Software companies based in Texas
Companies based in Austin, Texas
Companies established in 1998
1998 establishments in the United States
Defunct software companies of the United States